The Eaglet (French: L'aiglon) is a 1931 French historical drama film directed by Viktor Tourjansky and starring Jean Weber, Victor Francen, and Henri Desfontaines. It is an adaptation of the play L'Aiglon by Edmond Rostand, which portrays the life of Napoleon II.

A separate German-language version The Duke of Reichstadt was also made. It was directed by Tourjansky but featuring a different cast.

The film's sets were designed by the art director Serge Piménoff.

Cast
 Jean Weber as L'aiglon (Napoleon II)
 Victor Francen as Flambeau  
 Henri Desfontaines as Metternich
 Simone Vaudry as Thérèse de Lorget  
 Georges Colin as Le maréchal Marmont  
 Jeanne Boitel as La comtesse Camerata  
 Gustave Berthier as Gentz  
 Henri Kerny as Sedlinsky  
 Jenny Hélia as L'impératrice Marie-Louise
 Roger Blum as Prokesch  
 Fordyce as Fanny Elssler
 de Kerdec as Tiburce  
 Henri Debain as Le sergent 
 Camille Beuve as Le général Hartmann  
 Raymond de Boncour as Le tailleur  
 Nilda Duclos as L'archiduchesse  
 Jean Diéner as Le docteur  
 Émile Drain as Napoléon  
 Georges Deneubourg 
 Alexandre Mathillon

References

Bibliography 
 Goble, Alan. The Complete Index to Literary Sources in Film. Walter de Gruyter, 1999.

External links 
 

1931 films
French historical films
1930s historical films
1930s French-language films
Films directed by Victor Tourjansky
Films set in the 1810s
Films set in the 1820s
Films set in the 1830s
French multilingual films
Films based on works by Edmond Rostand
Cultural depictions of Klemens von Metternich
Cultural depictions of Napoleon II
Depictions of Napoleon on film
French black-and-white films
1931 multilingual films
Films set in the Austrian Empire
1930s French films